Turkey was represented by Çetin Alp and the Short Waves at the 1983 Eurovision Song Contest, which took place in Munich on 23 April 1983. Çetin Alp won the rights to represent Turkey on 4 March 1983.

Before Eurovision

7. Eurovision Şarkı Yarışması Türkiye Finali 
The final took place on 4 March 1983 at the TRT Studios in Ankara, hosted by Başak Doğru. Eight songs competed and the winner was determined by an expert jury.

At Eurovision
On the night of the contest Alp performed 6th following Italy and preceding Spain. At the close of voting Opera had received nul points placing Turkey joint 19 place (along with Spain). The Turkish jury awarded its 12 points to Yugoslavia.

Voting 
Turkey did not receive any points at the 1983 Eurovision Song Contest.

References

External links
  Turkish national Final 1983

1983
Countries in the Eurovision Song Contest 1983
Eurovision